The second season of the American competitive reality television series MasterChef had a two-night premiere on Fox on June 6 and 7, 2011.

The season concluded on August 16, 2011, with former Miss USA contestant Jennifer Behm as the winner, and Adrien Nieto as the runner-up. Unlike the previous winner, Behm's prize did not include a cookbook deal.

Top 18

Elimination table

 (WINNER) This cook won the competition.
 (RUNNER-UP) This cook finished in second place.
 (WIN) The cook won the individual challenge (Mystery Box Challenge or Elimination Test).
 (WIN) The cook was on the winning team in the Team Challenge and directly advanced to the next round.
 (HIGH) The cook was one of the top entries in the individual challenge, but didn't win.
 (IN) The cook wasn't selected as a top or bottom entry in an individual challenge.
 (IMM) The cook didn't have to compete in that round of competition and was safe from elimination.
 (PT) The cook was on the losing team in the Team Challenge, competed in the Pressure Test, and advanced.
 (NPT) The cook was on the losing team in the Team Challenge, did not compete in the Pressure Test, and advanced.
 (LOW) The cook was one of the bottom entries in an individual challenge or Pressure Test, but advanced.
 (ELIM) The cook was eliminated from MasterChef.

Episodes

References

2011 American television seasons
MasterChef (American TV series)